Jamie Alexander Blackley (born 8 July 1991) is a British actor. He is known for his role as Adam Wilde in the film If I Stay.

Biography
Blackley was born in Douglas, Isle of Man, and was raised in London, England, with his father Martin, mother Marina, and older sister Holly-Anna. His first major appearance was as Hanschen in the London stage production of Spring Awakening. Blackley had a small role as Iain in the fairy tale/action-adventure movie Snow White and the Huntsman (2012), but some of his most prominent film roles include Mark in the thriller Uwantme2killhim? (2013),  Sigurdur Thordarson in the thriller The Fifth Estate (2013), and Adam Wilde in the romantic drama If I Stay (2014). He played Freddie Hamilton in The Halcyon.

Filmography

Film

Television

Theatre

Video games

Awards

References

External links 

 
 Jamie Blackley  at Earache Voices
 

Living people
Manx male actors
People from Douglas, Isle of Man
21st-century Manx male actors
British expatriates in South Korea
1991 births